Chirnside Park is a suburb in Melbourne, Victoria, Australia, 32 km north-east from Melbourne's central business district, located within the Shire of Yarra Ranges local government area.

Brief history

From 1838 the area formed part of an extensive grazing grant that was developed further by a succession of owners up until the 1920s. The original sub-division of Chirnside Park was, at that time, known as Mooroolbark Park. Around 1000 acres (4 km2) of mainly rich black basaltic soil was grazed and cultivated, watered from two perpetual springs.

In 1921 George Chirnside sold Werribee Park, moving the family's stud herds and the contents of Werribee Mansion to Mooroolbark Park. After George Chirnside's death in 1941, permission to sell the estate was given in 1950 and finalised some years later. Subdivision was approved by the then Shire of Lillydale in 1956 with the residential area, centred on the two-storey stone homestead, country club and golf course, named Chirnside Park in 1962 in honour of Thomas Chirnside, who founded the Chirnside empire in 1839.

Amadeo DeVincentiis, an Italian from Abruzzo, also owned great swathes of what is now known as Chirnside Park. However, he sold it for a paltry amount in the 1960s, and within years the fortunate purchasers stood to make thousands. Amadeo attempted to rescind the sale, spending thousands, but failed.

Formerly West Lilydale, the surrounding region became known as Chirnside Park in the 1970s, the Post Office opening on 25 September 1979.

Chirnside Park today

Nominally a suburb, Chirnside Park is a satellite community of Lilydale. Thus the services that cannot be met in the nearby shopping complex are found elsewhere. The residential area was originally structured around the large 18-hole golf course, although this has now been closed and a new estate known as Cloverlea has commenced construction, with dwellings on the North Eastern corner now completed. Further residential development exists to the west and north. Some new medical facilities have arrived recently. Chirnside Park Family Clinic is one of them.

In area, however, most of the 'suburb' still retains a rural flavour, extending well into the Yarra Valley to the north, with commercial wineries, orchards and livestock farming, as well as large area residential estates. The Heritage Golf and Country Club, designed by Jack Nicklaus, also nestles in the northwest corner of the suburb directly on the Yarra River.

Chirnside Park Shopping Centre 

Chirnside Park Shopping Centre

Schools

Private Schools

 Oxley College (Chirnside Park).
 Most Private Schools offer P-12 education.

Government Schools

 Chirnside Park Primary School

Sport

The suburb has an Australian Rules football club as well as a Netball Club (established in the late 1990s), the Chirnside Park Panthers, competing in the Eastern Football League and Lilydale & Yarra Valley Netball Association.

Chirnside Park is also the home of the St Edmunds Basketball Club, one of Australia's largest basketball clubs, based out of the Oxley Stadium, competing in the Kilsyth & Mountain District Basketball Association.

The Chirnside Park Cricket club competes in the Ringwood District Cricket Association.  Established in 1984, the 'Panthers' Chirnside Park CC is located 35km east of Melbourne and is primarily affiliated with both the Ringwood District CA and the Women's Competition. Located at Kimberley Reserve, Kimberley Drive, Chirnside Park Cricket Club has 8 senior teams (6 men's, 1 women's & 1 winter men's), multiple junior teams (3 x U10, 3 x U12, U12 girls, 3 x U14, U15 girls & U18), and a Woolworths Junior Blasters.

People
The median age of the Chirnside Park residents was 39 years of age, one year over the Australian average.  75.4% of residents were born in Australia, compared to the Australian average of 66.7%. The other top responses for country of birth were England 5.3%, Italy 1.7%, and New Zealand 1.3%.
When asked about religion, the most common response was "No Religion" (35.1%), followed by Catholic (23.3%), and Anglican (11.9%).

References

External links 
 St Edmunds 'Saints' Basketball Club
 Oxley College Co-Educational Christian School
Australian Places - Chirnside Park
 Chirnside Park Primary School
 Chirnside Park Family Clinic

Suburbs of Melbourne
Yarra Ranges